Eric Heenan (29 April 1900 – 26 June 1998) was an Australian politician. He was born in Kanowna, Western Australia to Michael Joseph Heenan and Josephine Frances (McCarthy) and educated at CBC Wakefield Street Adelaide, South Australia,

Articled to Neville Heenan in Northam

Practiced Law in the Western Australian goldfields and Perth. Member of the Western Australian Legislative Council from 1936 to 1968 .

Married Joan McKenna, one child Eric Michael Heenan.

Enlisted in Australian Army in the First World War 22 July 1918.  Arrived in Durban on HMAT Boonah on way to Europe as peace declared.

References

1900 births
1998 deaths
Members of the Western Australian Legislative Council
Australian Labor Party members of the Parliament of Western Australia
20th-century Australian politicians
Australian military personnel of World War I